is a song by Aya Matsuura. It was released as her fifth single on February 6, 2002 under the Zetima label.

Track listing

Reception

The song was certified gold by the RIAJ.

Popular culture
This song is a playable track in the Japanese version of Donkey Konga.
Ai Fairouz covered the song as the ending theme for 2020 anime If My Favorite Pop Idol Made It to the Budokan, I Would Die.

References

External links 
 Momoiro Kataomoi entry on the Up-Front Works official website

Aya Matsuura songs
Zetima Records singles
2002 singles
Songs written by Tsunku
Song recordings produced by Tsunku